A turn-based strategy (TBS) game is a strategy game (usually some type of wargame, especially a strategic-level wargame) where players take turns when playing. This is distinguished from real-time strategy (RTS), in which all players play simultaneously.

Examples

Board games
Many board games are turn based, such as chess, Reversi, checkers, Hare games, and Go, as well as many modern board games.

Turn-based tactics

Turn-based tactical game-play is characterized by the expectation of players to complete their tasks by using the combat forces provided to them, and usually by the provision of a realistic (or at least believable) representation of military tactics and operations. Tactical role-playing games are a part of this genre. Examples include Fire Emblem, The Battle for Wesnoth, Poxnora, Silent Storm, Steel Panthers: World at War!, King's Bounty, Great Big War Game, Nintendo Wars, UniWar, XCOM 2 and Chessaria: The Tactical Adventure.

Mainstream computer games
After a period of converting board and historic TBS games to computer games, companies began basing computer turn-based strategy games on completely original properties or concepts. The presence of a computer to calculate and arbitrate allows game complexity which is not feasible in a traditional board game.

Some well known turn-based strategy games are Sid Meier's Civilization series, Heroes of Might and Magic series, Panzer General series, Warlords series, and Age of Wonders series.

Indie games

A further market trend is the rise of "Indie" TBS games (games produced by small groups, independent or only somewhat affiliated with the major elements in the computer games industry). These games often extend or refine already existing TBS games. Examples include Freeciv or Golden Age of Civilizations.

Open-source games
Since turn-based strategy games do not typically require vast amounts of art or modeling, developers willing to volunteer their time can focus on gameplay. Directories like Freecode provide large lists of open-source, turn-based strategy projects.

Browser-based games
Online browser-based games do not require users to install files and are often free.  The Hex Empire set of games is a good example of browser-based games in this genre.

See also
 List of turn-based strategy video games
 Time-keeping systems in games
 Real-time strategy

References

 
Video game genres
Video game terminology